Arkady Beynusovich (Benediktovich) Migdal (Lida, Russian Empire, 11 March 1911 – Princeton, United States, 9 February 1991) was a Soviet physicist and member of the  USSR Academy of Sciences. He developed the formula that accounts for the Landau–Pomeranchuk–Migdal effect, a reduction of the bremsstrahlung and pair production cross sections at high energies or high matter densities.

Biography
Arkady Migdal, whose father was a Jewish pharmacist, graduated from secondary school in Petrograd. In 1927 he published his first physics paper. He studied at Leningrad State University but was expelled in 1931 for his "non-proletarian origin". In 1933 he was arrested and imprisoned for 70 days. He graduated from Leningrad State University in 1936 with a Russian Candidate of Sciences degree (Ph.D.). His thesis advisor was Vladimir Fock. Migdal was a postdoc at the Leningrad Institute of Physics and Technology, where his supervisor was Matvei Petrovich Bronstein, and Yakov Frenkel was the chief of the theory department. From 1938 Migdal worked with Lev Landau at Moscow's Institute for Physical Problems, received there in 1943 his Russian Doctor of Sciences degree (habilitation), and was employed there until 1945. In 1944 Migdal also became a professor at National Research Nuclear University MEPhI (Moscow Engineering Physics Institute) (Национальный исследовательский ядерный университет "МИФИ", MIFI). From 1945 to 1971 Migdal was employed at Moscow's Kurchatov Institute, where he later became head of the theory department. From 1971 until his death in 1991 Migdal was a professor at the Landau Institute for Theoretical Physics of the Soviet Academy of Sciences in Moscow. His doctoral students include Anatoly Larkin.

In 1945 Migdal became a participant in the Soviet atomic project. At a meeting on November 30, 1945, instructions were given to a group of scientists, including Migdal, Abram Alikhanov (as chair), Lev Landau, Yulii Khariton, Samuil Reinberg, Mikhail Sadovsky, Sergei Sergeevich Vasiliev, and Alexander Pavlovich Zakoshikov, to analyze all available materials on the consequences of the use of atomic bombs in Hiroshima and Nagasaki and to determine the effectiveness of the blast factor, heat factor, and radiation factor.

In the early 1950s Migdal was one of the outstanding participants in the Landau seminars. He did important research in atomic and nuclear physics, quantum field theory, metal theory and other problems of modern theoretical physics. Using the methods of many-body theory in nuclear physics, he obtained important results in the theory of moments of inertia of the atomic nucleus. Using the ideas of the Fermi-liquid theory to describe finite systems, he and his colleagues were the first to quantitatively described important properties of nuclei — magnetic and quadrupole moments, isotopic shift, radiative transitions, and giant resonance in photo absorption. In 1954 he developed a rigorous quantum electrodynamic theory of bremsstrahlung and pair formation in media. In 1959 he suggested that the nuclear matter in neutron stars is a liquid in a superfluid state.

Migdal was awarded the Order of Lenin, the Order of the October Revolution, and, in three different years, the Order of the Red Banner of Labour.

He was active in mountaineering. For many years he was engaged in scuba diving. In 1959 he became the first chairman of the USSR Underwater Sports Federation with Sergey Petrovich Kapitsa as the deputy. In 1957 Migdal organized an underwater expedition to study the flora and fauna of the Black Sea. Together with S.P. Kapitsa and others, he designed and implemented the first scuba gear in the USSR.

In a 1977 interview, Migdal said:

In 1942 Artem Alikhanian and Abram Alikhanov went on an expedition into Yerevan to study cosmic rays. Toward the end of WW II, Landau, Pomeranchuk, and Migdal did some theoretical research on cosmic rays, concerning the theory of Auger showers.

Migdal was elected in 1953 a corresponding member and in 1966 a full member of the Academy of Sciences of the Soviet Union.

His son, Alexander Arkadyevich Migdal, is also a renowned physicist.

Books

Russian editions
 Тео­рия ко­неч­ных фер­ми-сис­тем и свой­ст­ва атом­ных ядер. (Theory of finite Fermi systems and properties of atomic nuclei) М. ("М." represents "Москва", i.e., "Moscow".), 1965;
 При­бли­жен­ные ме­то­ды кван­то­вой ме­ха­ни­ки. (Approximate methods of quantum mechanics) М., 1966; совм. с В. П. Край­но­вым (coauthored with V. P. Krainov)
 Ме­тод ква­зи­ча­стиц в тео­рии яд­ра. (Method of quasiparticles in nuclear theory) М., 1967.
 Качественные методы в квантовой теории. (Qualitative methods in quantum theory) — М.: «Наука» (Nauka). Главная редакция физико-математической литературы (Main edition of physical and mathematical literature), 1975. 336 с. (Here "с.' represents "страницы", i.e., "pages".)
 Фер­мио­ны и бо­зо­ны в силь­ных по­лях. (Fermions and bosons in strong fields) М., 1978.
 Поиски истины. (The search for truth) — М.: Молодая гвардия (Molodaya Gvardiya), 1983. — 239 с., ил. (Here"ил." represents the Russian word for "illustrated".)  — Эврика (Eureka book series)
 Как ро­ж­да­ют­ся фи­зи­че­ские тео­рии. (How physical theories are born) М., 1984.
 Квантовая физика для больших и маленьких. (Quantum physics for big and small) — М.: Наука, 1989. 144 с., .
 От до­гад­ки до ис­ти­ны. (From conjecture to truth) М., 2008.

English translations
  (translated by Seweryn Chomet)
  (translated by Anthony J. Leggett, according to p. iii)
 
  (translated by Anthony J. Leggett, according to page v)

References

External links
 Publication list, Arkady B. Migdal, Landau Institute

1911 births
1991 deaths
People from Lida
People from Lidsky Uyezd
Belarusian Jews
Soviet physicists
Belarusian physicists
Jewish Russian physicists
Full Members of the USSR Academy of Sciences